Klaipėda District Municipality (Lithuanian: Klaipėdos rajono savivaldybė) is one of 60 municipalities in Lithuania.

Elderships 

Klaipėda District Municipality is divided into 11 elderships:

Education 

The following institutions of general education are situated in Klaipėda district municipality:

Agluonėnai middle school
Brožiai middle school
Dituvos middle school
Dovilai middle school
Dreverna middle school
Endriejavas secondary school
Gargždai "Krantas" secondary school
Gargždai "Minija" secondary school
Gargždai Vaivorykštė gymnasium
The center of education of Gargždai "Naminukas"
Judrėnai Steponas Darius middle school
Ketvergiai middle school
Kretingalė middle school
Klaipėda district Lapiai middle school
Pašlūžmiai middle school
Plikiai middle school
Priekulė Ieva Simonaitytė secondary school
Priekulė special school
Pėžaičiai middle school
Šiūpariai middle school
Veiviržėnai gymnasium
Vėžaičiai middle school

References

External links 
 

 
Lithuania Minor
Municipalities of Lithuania